Ares 80 SAT is a Special operations support and fast attack craft made in Turkey. Qatar ordered six boats for its Coast Guard Command.

Similar vessels
Following vessels are similar to Ares 80 SAT:
 Ares 55 SAT
 Ares 100 SAT
 Ares 115 SAT
 Ares 150 SAT

References

Ships built in Antalya
Fast attack craft